Figure Five is an unincorporated community in Crawford County, Arkansas, United States.

References

Unincorporated communities in Crawford County, Arkansas
Unincorporated communities in Arkansas